

Hermann Albert Breith (7 May 1892 – 3 September 1964) was a German general during World War II. He was a recipient of the Knight's Cross of the Iron Cross with Oak Leaves and Swords of Nazi Germany. Breith commanded the III Army Corps.

Awards
 Iron Cross (1914) 2nd Class (10 September 1914) & 1st Class (30 July 1916)
 Knight's Cross of the Royal House Order of Hohenzollern with Swords (28 October 1918)
 Hanseatic Cross of Hamburg (16 April 1917)
 Wehrmacht Long Service Award 1st Class (2 October 1936)
 Clasp to the Iron Cross (1939) 2nd Class (23 September 1939) & 1st Class (2 October 1939)
 Wound Badge in Black (1 June 1940)
 Panzer Badge in Silver (20 May 1940)
 Knight's Cross of the Iron Cross with Oak Leaves and Swords
 Knight's Cross on 3 June 1940 as Oberst and commander of the 5. Panzer-Brigade
 69th Oak Leaves on 31 January 1942 as Generalmajor and commander of the 3. Panzer-Division
 48th Swords on 21 February 1944 as General der Panzertruppe and commanding general of the III. Panzer-Korps

References

Citations

Bibliography

 
 
 

1892 births
1964 deaths
People from Pirmasens
Generals of Panzer Troops
People from the Palatinate (region)
Recipients of the Knight's Cross of the Iron Cross with Oak Leaves and Swords
German prisoners of war in World War II held by the United States
People from the Kingdom of Bavaria
Prussian Army personnel
Recipients of the clasp to the Iron Cross, 1st class
Reichswehr personnel
20th-century Freikorps personnel
Military personnel from Rhineland-Palatinate